Berzina (Берзина) is a Russian surname. It may refer to the following:
 Maia Berzina (1910-2002) Soviet ethnographer, geographer and cartographer
 Svetlana Yakovlevna Berzina (1932-2012) Orientalist at the State Museum of the East, Moscow

See also 
 Berzin
 Bērziņš